Andrew Dodds (born 2 August 1991) is an Australian figure skater who competes in both men's singles and ice dance. As a single skater, he is a three-time Australian national silver medalist and has competed in the final segment at four Four Continents Championships. As an ice dancer with partner Chantelle Kerry, he is a two-time Australian national champion (2017, 2018) and has appeared at two Four Continents.

Personal life 
Andrew Dodds was born on 2 August 1991, in Gold Coast, Queensland. He studied commerce at Griffiths University. He has also studied Japanese. His brothers Matthew Dodds, Ryan Dodds and Jordan Dodds have also represented Australia in figure skating.

Career

Single skating 
Dodds began learning to skate in 1995. He competed at one ISU Junior Grand Prix competition, in September 2010 in Karuizawa, Japan.

Dodds received bronze medals at the New Zealand Winter Games in 2009 and 2011. He won his first senior national medal, bronze, during the 2011–2012 season. His ISU Championship debut came at the 2014 Four Continents in Taipei, Taiwan; his short program placement (27th) did not allow him to compete in the free skate. Similarly, his appearance at the 2015 Four Continents Championships (Seoul, South Korea) ended after the short program, in which he ranked 25th.

During the 2015–2016 season, Dodds became the Australian national silver medalist and competed in the final segment at the 2016 Four Continents Championships in Taipei, finishing 20th. The following season, he took bronze at the Australian Championships and placed 20th at the 2017 Four Continents Championships in Gangneung, South Korea. He was coached by Margaret Nicholls in Gold Coast, Queensland.

Ice dancing 
Dodds had a tryout with Australian single skater Chantelle Kerry in April 2017. They announced their partnership in mid-May, after Dodds had passed his dance tests. The two are coached by Monica MacDonald and John Dunn in Sydney, New South Wales, Australia.

Kerry/Dodds debuted their partnership at the 2017 International Cup of Nice, finishing 16th.

In popular culture
In 2018, Andrew Dodds and Chantelle Kerry appeared in the music video of "Before I Go" by Australian singer Guy Sebastian.

Programs

Ice dancing

Single skating

Competitive highlights 
CS: Challenger Series; JGP: Junior Grand Prix

Ice dancing with Kerry

Men's singles

References

External links 
 
 

1991 births
Australian male ice dancers
Australian male single skaters
Living people
Sportspeople from the Gold Coast, Queensland
Competitors at the 2013 Winter Universiade